Peder Balke (November 4, 1804 – February 5, 1887) was a Norwegian painter. He is known for portraying the landscape of Norway in a romantic and dramatic manner.

Biography
Peder Andersen was born on the island of Helgøya, in Hedmark county, Norway. He was the son of  Anders Thoresen and Pernille Pedersdatter. He grew up in Ringsaker, but lived in the 1820s on the Balke farm in Toten in Oppland county. Farmers in Toten paid for his education, and he decorated several farms in Toten in return. They actively encouraged his painting activities and later supported him in obtaining higher education.

In the autumn of 1827, Balke served as an apprentice to  engraver and painter  Heinrich August Grosch (1763–1843).  He was also a student at the Tegneskole under Grosch and Jacob Munch. Balke signed a two-year contract as an apprentice to the Danish decorator and artist Jens Funch. From autumn 1829 to spring 1833, he was a pupil of Carl Johan Fahlcrantz at the Royal Swedish Academy of Fine Arts in Stockholm. Balke was also a pupil of Johan Christian Dahl from 1843 to 1844.

During the summer of 1830 he walked through Telemark, Rjukan, Vestfjorddalen through Røldal and Kinsarvik to the city of Bergen, and then back through Vossevangen to Gudvangen, further over Filefjell to Valdres and then across the mountains to Hallingdal. Along the way, he painted and drew small sketches that were later developed into paintings. He also traveled to Germany, and Russia. He visited Paris and London.

In Stockholm, he completed several of the paintings he had outlined on his 1832 Finnmark tour. Some of these were sold to the royal family. In 1846 he sold thirty of his paintings to Louis Philippe I of France for the Palace of Versailles.

Legacy
Besides the 17 paintings in the National Gallery in Oslo, Peder Balke is also represented at several major art collections in Norway and Sweden.

The National Gallery in London organized the greatest display of his work in the UK, a collection of over 50 paintings, from public and private collections in November 2014 - April 2015.

Personal life
He was married in 1834 to Karen Eriksdatter Strand. He was engaged in social questions and organized the construction of Balkeby, a new part of Oslo, with improved living conditions for workers. He also advocated grants for artists and pensions for men and women. He was the great-grandfather of actress, playwright and artist Turid Balke (1921–2000) and great-great-grandfather of  jazz pianist  Jon Balke. He died at Christiania and was buried at Vestre Aker kirkegård.

Balkeby
Peder Balke purchased parcels of the historic Nedre Blindern farm between 1858 and 1876. The Balke association organized the suburb. Plot buyers could borrow money from Balke and construct the building themselves. By 1865, there were 300 people in Balkeby and the area was relatively well populated by workers. Eventually they took in lodgers, so that the population increased.

Balkeby provided an opportunity for a population to have their own home within a reasonable distance from the city, especially after the horse trams came in 1875. In 1878, when the area was incorporated into the city of Oslo, about 1,100 people lived there. Balke had set up strict rules for construction, including the planning of wide streets to prevent the spreading of fire. However, on 13 June 1879, many of the houses in Balkeby burned to the ground.

The former Balkeby suburb was located northeast of what is today Oslo's main shopping street Bogstadveien in Majorstuen  and Hegdehaugen  neighbourhoods  in the Frogner district of Oslo.

Selected paintings

References

Other sources
Knut Ljøgodt (2014)  Peder Balke: Visjon og Revolusjon (Tromsø: Nordnorsk kunstmuseum) 
Marit Ingeborg Lange, Knut Ljøgodt, Christopher Riopelle (2015) Paintings by Peder Balke (Yale University Press)

Related reading
Jackson, D. (2012) Nordic Art, The Modern Breakthrough  (Hirmer)

External links
 The Northern Lights Route
Balkeby
Balke - senteret, wall paintings on a farm where Peder lived in his youth

1804 births
1887 deaths
People from Ringsaker
19th-century Norwegian painters
Norwegian landscape painters
Norwegian romantic painters
Norwegian male painters
19th-century Norwegian male artists